Brandon Kyle Bowman (born October 15, 1984) is an American professional basketball player who last played for Gießen 46ers of the Basketball Bundesliga. He played college basketball at Georgetown University where he played primarily at the small forward position under coach John Thompson III. Bowman was a preseason candidate for the 2006 John R. Wooden Award for the best collegiate men's basketball player.

High school career
Bowman attended Westchester High School in Westchester, California, where he averaged 14 points and eight rebounds while leading his team to a 32–2 record, the California State Division I-A Championship, and a USA Today No. 1 ranking in his senior year. Bowman was a member of the 2002 USA Team at the International Albert Schweitzer Youth Basketball Tournament in Mannheim, Germany.

Collegiate career
Bowman was a third-team all-Big East Conference selection in his junior year. He was the team's leading scorer (15.1 ppg) and second leading rebounder (6.1 rpg). After declaring for the NBA draft, he withdrew his name from the candidates' list. He went back to Georgetown, rejoining senior standouts Ashanti Cook and Darrel Owens, and closed his collegiate career with 11 points and 5.2 rebounds per game, distinguishing himself particularly during the Hoyas' upset over the then undefeated #1 Duke Blue Devils, in which he scored 23 points and grabbed 8 rebounds.

Professional career

2006–07 season
After going undrafted in the 2006 NBA draft, Bowman joined the Portland Trail Blazers for the 2006 NBA Summer League. On October 2, 2006, he signed with the New Jersey Nets. However, he was later waived by the Nets on October 19, 2006.

On November 2, 2006, he was selected with the 11th overall pick by the Bakersfield Jam in the 2006 NBA D-League draft.

2007–08 season
In July 2007, Bowman joined the Los Angeles Clippers for the 2007 NBA Summer League. In October 2007, he was re-acquired by the Bakersfield Jam. On January 2, 2008, he terminated his contract with the Jam. The next day, he signed with Basket Draghi Novara of Italy for the rest of the season.

2008–09 season
In July 2008, Bowman joined the New Orleans Hornets for the 2008 NBA Summer League. In August 2008, he signed with Telekom Baskets Bonn of Germany for the 2008–09 season.

2009–10 season
In September 2009, Bowman signed with the Philadelphia 76ers. However, he was later waived by the 76ers on October 21, 2009.

On November 17, 2009, he signed with Tofaş Bursa of Turkey for rest of the 2009–10 season.

2010–11 season
In July 2010, Bowman joined the Charlotte Bobcats for the 2010 NBA Summer League. He later signed with Lukoil Academic of Bulgaria for the 2010–11 season. On January 25, 2011, he left Lukoil Academic and signed a six-week contract with Le Mans of France as an injury replacement for Alain Koffi. In March 2011, he left Le Mans and signed with FMP Železnik of Serbia for the rest of the season.

2011–12 season
On August 1, 2011, Bowman signed with Maccabi Rishon LeZion of Israel for the 2011–12 season.

2012–13 season
In July 2012, Bowman was selected with the ninth overall pick by Wonju Dongbu Promy in the 2012 Korean Basketball League draft. In October 2012, he was traded to the Seoul Samsung Thunders. In November 2012, he was released by the Thunders after just 4 games.

On January 12, 2013, he signed with Hapoel Gilboa Galil of Israel. On February 19, 2013, he was released by Galil Gilboa.

2013–14 season
On November 22, 2013, Bowman signed with SC Rasta Vechta of Germany for the rest of the 2013–14 season.

On May 13, 2014, he signed with the Wellington Saints for the rest of the 2014 New Zealand NBL season. On May 23, 2014, he made his debut for the Saints. In just under 26 minutes of action, he recorded 22 points, 8 rebounds, 2 assists and 2 steals in a 111–114 loss to the Super City Rangers.

2014–15 season
On June 24, 2014, he signed with Medi Bayreuth of Germany for the 2014–15 season.

On June 19, 2015, he signed a one-month deal with Atenienses de Manatí of Puerto Rico.

2015–16 season
On December 12, 2015, he signed with AEK Larnaca of Cyprus for the 2015–16 season.

2016–17 season
On October 5, 2016, he signed with Spirou Charleroi of Belgium for the 2016–17 season. On January 11, 2017, he parted ways with Charleroi. The next day, he signed with Israeli club Maccabi Kiryat Gat.

2017–18 season
On August 28, 2017, he signed a two-year deal with the Israeli team Maccabi Haifa. On October 23, 2017, Bowman recorded a career-high 30 points, including a buzzer-beating three-point shot to send the game into overtime, in an 89–85 win over Ironi Nes Ziona, and later was named Israeli League Round 3 MVP.

2018–19 season
On January 26, 2019, he signed with Maccabi Rehovot of the Liga Leumit for the rest of the season.

In May 2019, Bowman joined the Hawke's Bay Hawks for the rest of the 2019 New Zealand NBL season.

2020–21 season
On September 7, 2020, Bowman signed with Gießen 46ers of the Basketball Bundesliga.

Personal
Bowman is the son of Tom and Sharon Bowman, and has three brothers Tom, Stephan and Zach and one sister, Nicole. He is also the cousin of former NBA players Antoine and Samaki Walker.

References

External links
 Profile at Eurobasket.com
 Georgetown bio

1984 births
Living people
AEK Larnaca B.C. players
African-American basketball players
American expatriate basketball people in Belgium
American expatriate basketball people in Bulgaria
American expatriate basketball people in Cyprus
American expatriate basketball people in France
American expatriate basketball people in Germany
American expatriate basketball people in Israel
American expatriate basketball people in Italy
American expatriate basketball people in New Zealand
American expatriate basketball people in Serbia
American expatriate basketball people in South Korea
American men's basketball players
Bakersfield Jam players
Basketball players from California
Georgetown Hoyas men's basketball players
Giessen 46ers players
Hapoel Gilboa Galil Elyon players
Hawke's Bay Hawks players
Kagawa Five Arrows players
KK FMP (1991–2011) players
Le Mans Sarthe Basket players
Maccabi Haifa B.C. players
Maccabi Kiryat Gat B.C. players
Maccabi Rehovot B.C. players
Maccabi Rishon LeZion basketball players
Medi Bayreuth players
Seoul Samsung Thunders players
Small forwards
Spirou Charleroi players
Sportspeople from Beverly Hills, California
Telekom Baskets Bonn players
Tofaş S.K. players
Wellington Saints players
Wonju DB Promy players
Westchester High School (Los Angeles) alumni
21st-century African-American sportspeople
20th-century African-American people